Alannah Stephenson (born 4 December 1996) is an Irish female badminton player. In 2012, she became the runner-up of Fyffes Irish Future Series 2012 in women's doubles event with her partner Rachael Darragh. In 2014, she participated at the Commonwealth Games in Glasgow, Scotland.

References

External links
 
 

1996 births
Living people
Sportspeople from Lisburn
Irish female badminton players
Commonwealth Games competitors for Northern Ireland
Badminton players at the 2014 Commonwealth Games